Svag doft av skymning is a 2012 studio album by Peter LeMarc.

Track listing
Svag doft av skymning
Memphis i himlen
Bästa stunden på dan
Gråta som en karl
Våra bästa dar
Min kyrka
En sång som ingen radio spelar
På mitt hjärtas torg
Har någon sett till Douglas?
Regn mot ett rostigt tak
Den nakna sanningen

Contributors
Peter LeMarc - singer, composer, song lyrics, producer
Jerker Odelholm - bass
Andreas Dahlbäck - drums, percussion
Stephan Forkelid - piano, electric piano
Ola Gustafsson - gitarr, pedal steel
David Nyström-– hammond organ
Bebe Risenfors - glockenspiel, saxophone, cornet, alto horn, bass tuba, clarinet, harmonica, omnichord
Per Lindholm - producer
Ronny Lahti - producer

Charts

References 

2012 albums
Peter LeMarc albums
Swedish-language albums